Harpoon is a series of realistic air and naval computer wargames based upon Larry Bond's miniatures game of the same name. Players can choose between either the Blue or Red side in simulated naval combat situations, which includes local conflicts as well as simulated Cold War confrontations between the Superpowers. Missions range from small missile boat engagements to large oceanic battles, with dozens of vessels and hundreds of aircraft. The game includes large databases containing many types of real world ships, submarines, aircraft, and land defenses (i.e. air bases and ports).

Overview
The simulations have a dedicated fan base with several websites offering a varying styles of scenarios and discussion forums, especially as the latest edition includes a feature to allow players to create their own scenarios. Often described as a "niche within a niche market," development of the simulation has progressed steadily through the years despite the overwhelming numerical and graphical superiority of first-person shooter and real-time strategy games. Advanced Gaming Systems, Inc. (AGSI), developers of Harpoon 3 Advanced Naval Warfare and Harpoon Commander's Edition (with HarpGamer), currently distributes the simulation as a Harpoon Ultimate Edition through Matrix games with technical support handled on a co-operative basis by AGSI, HarpGamer, and Matrix games employees.

Harpoon was originally published by Three-Sixty Pacific and has had several development paths and publishers. Despite the widespread success of the game, Three-Sixty Pacific experienced financial difficulties and went under in 1994. Currently all computer rights rest with AGSI, who continues to improve the series with new developments and releases. In 2006, AGSI released Harpoon Advanced Naval Warfare (ANW) which allowed players to compete with human opponents for the first time in the game's history.

Harpoon's interface emphasizes technical accuracy over graphical polish, with simple 2D symbols to simulate a warship's radar display. There has been considerable debate in the game's user community about the decision of the developers to utilize 3D graphics in later versions of the program. Since March 2009, two releases are available to AGSI civilian customers. Harpoon Commanders Edition is an updating version based on the game engine of the original series. Harpoon 3 Advanced Naval Warfare is the current civilian edition of the product.  Military customers are offered Harpoon 3 Pro, which is tailored for customer specifications. There was a Macintosh version that lies between the Harpoon II and Harpoon 3 Advanced Naval Warfare called "Harpoon III v3.6.3" aka "H3"

Commercial development of both versions has ceased.  The most recent release of Harpoon 3 Advanced Naval Warfare aka "ANW" is V3.11.1. (January 2013).  While the most recent commercial release of Harpoon Commander's Edition aka "HCE" is v2009.097 (October 2010), Matrix Games makes available version v2015.027 (January 2016) as a direct download from its Harpoon page. 

Harpoon Commander's Edition has been under development by volunteers with new beta versions available via the HarpGamer HC Beta Current Files.   All beta versions install on top of v2015.027.

The H3 MilSim (aka Harpoon 3 Professional) product is still available.

Gameplay
The games play in real time, with time acceleration capability in case the action slows down. The player can control single or multiple platforms (thousands if the computing power is available). The game is extremely comprehensive, although certain elements of naval warfare are not modeled, such as radar ducting, sonar bottom and surface bounce, and COMINT/SIGINT.

Reception
Computer Gaming World said that Harpoon IIs long delay helped the game, approving of the Windows-like interface for the DOS game. The editors of PC Gamer US nominated Harpoon II for their 1994 "Best Wargame" award, although it lost to Panzer General.

Titles

See also 
 Command: Modern Air Naval Operations

References

External links
Advanced Gaming Systems (AGSI), the series current developers
AGSI's Wiki for historical materials
Professional military specific version
Matrix Games' Harpoon Forum, current publishers of the commercial versions
Clash of Arms, publisher of Harpoon paper version

Harpgamer - Developers of Harpoon Classic (Commander's Edition) and support forum.
Harpoon HeadQuarters - The second-oldest community Harpoon site.

Video game franchises
Computer wargames
Naval video games
Cold War video games
Ship simulation games
Video game franchises introduced in 1989
Video games developed in the United States